The speaker of the Bangsamoro Parliament is the presiding officer of the Bangsamoro Parliament, the regional legislature of Bangsamoro Autonomous Region in Muslim Mindanao (BARMM) of the Philippines.

The current speaker is Pangalian Balindong, who was elected by the parliament at the start of its inaugural session on March 29, 2019.

History
Prior to the establishment of the Bangsamoro Parliament on March 29, 2019, Chief Minister Murad Ebrahim named Moro Islamic Liberation Front (MILF) leader Ghazali Jaafar as the person he preferred to become the first speaker of the parliament with lawyer and former Lanao del Sur congressman Pangalian Balindong as Jaafar's deputy. However Jaafar died on March 13. At the start of the inaugural session of the parliament, there were two nominees for the speakership, Balindong and Laisa Alamia, with the former elected by the interim Bangsamoro Parliament as its speaker. Hatimil Hassan was elected as Balindong's deputy speaker. Additional co-deputies were elected by the parliament at later dates.

Function
The speaker is the presiding officer of the Bangsamoro Parliament whose role is to secure the honor of the parliament, ensure the rights and privileges of its members, and assure public access to its proceedings. The same presiding role could also be fulfilled by the speaker's deputies.
The speaker also has administrative supervision over legislative personnel, staff, and secretariat of the Bangsamoro Parliament and is also the appointing authority of all career positions win the parliament. Although the speaker is mandated to consult with the chief minister first for appointments of positions which has a salary grade of 25 and above.

List

References

See also
Speaker of the House of Representatives of the Philippines

Chairs of subnational legislatures
Chairs of unicameral legislatures
Bangsamoro Parliament